The Ligue 2 Moorea is the regional league of island of Moorea, in French Polynesia. It is considered a second-tier league, despite any club be promoted to Ligue 1, the top-tier competition in the country.

Teams 
These are the teams for the 2020–21 Ligue 2 Moorea season:

Mira
A.S. Tamarii Tapuhute
Tearaa
A.S. Temanava 2
A.S. Tiare Anani
A.S. Tiare Hinano
Tiare Tahiti 2
A.S. Tohie'a

Last champions
 2001/02: A.S. Tiare Hinano
 2002/03: unknown
 2003/04: unknown
 2004/05: unknown
 2005/06: Tiare Tahiti
 2006/07: Tiare Tahiti
 2007/08: A.S. Tapuhute
 2008/09: Tiare Tahiti
 2009-10: A.S. Temanava
 2010-11: unknown
 2011-12: unknown
 2012-13: unknown
 2013-14: Tiare Tahiti
 2014-15: A.S. Mira
 2015-16: Tiare Tahiti
 2016-17: Tiare Tahiti
 2017-18: Tiare Tahiti
 2018-19: A.S. Mira
 2019-20: A.S. Temanava

References

External links
Fixtures and results at Fédération Tahitienne de Football

Football competitions in French Polynesia
Football in Mo'orea